Jeffrey Pears (14 June 1920 – 6 April 2003) was an English professional footballer who played as a goalkeeper in the Football League for York City, and in non-League football for Scarborough. He worked at Terry's chocolate factory for 50 years, latterly as chauffeur to the chairman.

References

1920 births
Footballers from York
2003 deaths
English footballers
Association football goalkeepers
York City F.C. players
Scarborough F.C. players
English Football League players